In the Kingdom of England, the title of Secretary of State came into being near the end of the reign of Queen Elizabeth I (1558–1603), the usual title before that having been King's Clerk, King's Secretary, or Principal Secretary.

From the time of Henry VIII, there were usually two secretaries of state. After the restoration of the monarchy of 1660, the two posts were specifically designated as the Secretary of State for the Northern Department and the Secretary of State for the Southern Department. Both dealt with home affairs and they divided foreign affairs between them.

History

The medieval kings of England had a clerical servant, at first known as their Clerk, later as their Secretary. The primary duty of this office was carrying on the monarch's official correspondence, but in varying degrees the holder also advised the Crown, and by the early fourteenth century, the position was in effect the third most powerful office of state in England, ranking after the Lord Chancellor.

Most administrative business went through the royal household, particularly the Wardrobe. The Privy Seal's warrants increased rapidly in quantity and frequency during the late Middle Ages. The Signet warrant, kept by the Keeper of the Privy Seal, could be used to stamp documents on authority of chancery and on behalf of the Chancellor. During wartime, the king took his privy seal with him wherever he went. Its controller was the Secretary, who served on military and diplomatic missions; and the Wardrobe clerks assumed an even greater importance.

Until the reign of King Henry VIII (1509–1547), there was usually only one such secretary at a time, but by the end of Henry's reign there was also a second secretary. At about the end of the reign of Henry's daughter Elizabeth I (1558–1603), the secretaries began to be called "Secretary of State". After the Restoration of 1660, the two posts came to be known as the Secretary of State for the Northern Department and the Secretary of State for the Southern Department. Both of the secretaries dealt with internal matters, but they also divided foreign affairs between them. One dealt with northern Europe (the mostly Protestant states) and the other with southern Europe. Following the Glorious Revolution of 1688, the Cabinet took over the practical direction of affairs previously undertaken by the Privy Council, and the two secretaries of state gained ever more responsible powers.

List of officeholders

 John Maunsell (1253–1263?)
 Francis Accursii (1277?–1282?)
 John de Benstede (1299)
 William Melton (1308)
 William Trussell (1332)
 William of Wykeham (1360)
 Robert Braybrooke (1379)

Lancaster and York
 John Profit (1402–1412)
 John Stone (1415 – c. 1420)
 John Castell (1420)
 William Alnwick (c. 1420 – c. 1422)
 William Hayton (?–1432)
 James Lunayn (1434–1443) (King's Secretary to the Kingdom of France)
 Jean de Rinel (1434–1442) (King's Secretary in his Realm of France)
 Thomas Beckington (1439–1443)
 Gervais de Vulre (1442–1451)
 Michael de Parys
 Thomas Mannyng (1460–1464)
 Gylet de Ferrers
 William Hatteclyffe (c. 1464 – 1480)
 Oliver King (1480–1483)
 John Kendal (1483–1485)

Tudor
 Richard Foxe (1485–1487)
 Oliver King (1487–1492) (probably)
 Thomas Routhall (1500–1516)
 Richard Pace (1516–1526)
 William Knight (1526 – August 1529)
 Stephen Gardiner (5 August 1529 – April 1534)
 Thomas Cromwell (April 1534 – April 1540)

 Sir Robert Cecil (July 1596 – 24 May 1612)

Stuart
 John Herbert (10 May 1600 – 9 July 1617)
 Robert Carr, Lord Rochester (May 1612 – March 1614)
 Sir Ralph Winwood (29 March 1614 – 27 October 1617)
 Sir Thomas Lake (3 January 1616 – 16 February 1619)
 Sir Robert Naunton (8 January 1618 – 14 January 1623)
 Sir George Calvert (16 February 1619 – January 1625)
 Sir Edward Conway (14 January 1623 – 14 December 1628)
 Sir Albertus Morton (9 February 1625 – 6 September 1625)
 Sir John Coke (9 September 1625 – 3 February 1640)
 Dudley Carleton, 1st Viscount Dorchester (14 December 1628 – 15 February 1632)
 Sir Francis Windebank (15 June 1632 – December 1640)
 Sir Henry Vane (3 February 1640 – December 1641)
 Sir Edward Nicholas (27 November 1641 – 1646 when he left England; he was reappointed by King Charles II September 1654 – 2 October 1662)
 Lucius Cary, 2nd Viscount Falkland (8 January 1642 – 20 September 1643)
 George Digby, 2nd Earl of Bristol (28 September 1643 – 1645)

Commonwealth and Protectorate
 Thomas Scot (July 1649 – April 1652)
 John Thurloe (April 1652 – May 1660)

For the subsequent period see:
Secretary of State for the Northern Department
Secretary of State for the Southern Department

References

Citations

Sources

Further reading
 

 
Titles
Government of England
Government occupations
Lists of English people